The Loman Volcano group is a field of lava domes in Afghanistan. The group is composed of Quaternary lava domes. The last known eruption occurred in the Pleistocene epoch.

References 

Volcanoes of Afghanistan
Pleistocene lava domes